Ungaro is a surname, meaning 'of Hungarian descent/origin'. Notable people with the surname include:

 Emanuel Ungaro (1933–2019), French fashion designer
 Gaetano Ungaro (born 1987, Reggio Calabria), Italian professional football player
 Joseph M. Ungaro (1930–2006), American journalist
 Malatesta Ungaro (born Galeotto Malatesta; 1327–1372), Italian condottiero and lord of Jesi
 Patrick J. Ungaro (1941–2019), American (Ohio) politician
 Ursula Mancusi Ungaro (Ungaro-Benages) (born 1951), American lawyer and judge

Italian-language surnames
Ethnonymic surnames
Surnames of Hungarian origin